Religious liberalism is a conception of religion (or of a particular religion) which emphasizes personal and group liberty and rationality. It is an attitude towards one's own religion (as opposed to criticism of religion from a secular position, and as opposed to criticism of a religion other than one's own) which contrasts with a traditionalist or orthodox approach, and it is directly opposed by trends of religious fundamentalism. It is related to religious liberty, which is the tolerance of different religious beliefs and practices, but not all promoters of religious liberty are in favor of religious liberalism, and vice versa.

Overview
In the context of religious liberalism, liberalism conveys the sense of classical liberalism as it developed in the Age of Enlightenment, which forms the starting point of both religious and political liberalism; but religious liberalism does not necessarily coincide with all meanings of liberalism in political philosophy. For example, an empirical attempt to show a link between religious liberalism and political liberalism proved inconclusive in a 1973 study in Illinois.

Usage of the term liberal in the context of religious philosophy appeared as early as the mid-19th century and became established by the first part of the 20th century; for example, in 1936, philosophy professor and Disciples of Christ minister Edward Scribner Ames wrote in his article "Liberalism in Religion": 

Religious traditionalists, who reject the idea that tenets of modernity should have any impact on religious tradition, challenge the concept of religious liberalism. Secularists, who reject the idea that implementation of rationalistic or critical thought leaves any room for religion altogether, likewise dispute religious liberalism.

In Christianity

"Liberal Christianity" is an umbrella term for certain developments in Christian theology and culture since the Enlightenment of the late 18th century. It has become mostly mainstream within the major Christian denominations in the Western world, but is opposed by a movement of Christian fundamentalism which developed in response to these trends, and by Evangelicalism generally. It also contrasts with conservative forms of Christianity outside the Western world and outside the reach of Enlightenment philosophy and modernism, mostly within Eastern Christianity.

The Catholic Church in particular has a long tradition of controversy regarding questions of religious liberalism. Cardinal John Henry Newman (1801–1890), for example, was considered to be moderately liberal by 19th-century standards because he was critical of papal infallibility, but he explicitly opposed "liberalism in religion" because he argued it would lead to complete relativism.

The conservative Presbyterian biblical scholar J. Gresham Machen criticized what he termed "naturalistic liberalism" in his 1923 book, Christianity and Liberalism, in which he intended to show that "despite the liberal use of traditional phraseology modern liberalism not only is a different religion from Christianity but belongs in a totally different class of religions". The Anglican Christian apologist C. S. Lewis voiced a similar view in the mid-20th century, arguing that "theology of the liberal type" amounted to a complete re-invention of Christianity and a rejection of Christianity as understood by its own founders.

In Judaism

German-Jewish religious reformers began to incorporate critical thought and humanist ideas into Judaism from the early 19th century. This resulted in the creation of various non-Orthodox denominations, from the moderately liberal Conservative Judaism to very liberal Reform Judaism. The moderate wing of Modern Orthodox Judaism, especially Open Orthodoxy, espouses a similar approach.

In Islam
Liberalism and progressivism within Islam involve professed Muslims who have created a considerable body of liberal thought about Islamic understanding and practice. Their work is sometimes characterized as "progressive Islam"; some scholars, such as Omid Safi, regard progressive Islam and liberal Islam as two distinct movements.

The methodologies of liberal or progressive Islam rest on the interpretation of traditional Islamic scripture (the Quran) and other texts (such as the Hadith), a process called ijtihad. This can vary from the slight to the most liberal, where only the meaning of the Quran is considered to be a revelation, with its expression in words seen as the work of the prophet Muhammad in his particular time and context.

Liberal Muslims see themselves as returning to the principles of the early ummah ethical and pluralistic intent of the Quran. They distance themselves from some traditional and less liberal interpretations of Islamic law which they regard as culturally based and without universal applicability. The reform movement uses Tawhid (monotheism) "as an organizing principle for human society and the basis of religious knowledge, history, metaphysics, aesthetics, and ethics, as well as social, economic and world order".

Islamic Modernism has been described as "the first Muslim ideological response to the Western cultural challenge" attempting to reconcile Islamic faith with modern values such as nationalism, democracy, civil rights, rationality, equality, and progress. It featured a "critical reexamination of the classical conceptions and methods of jurisprudence" and a new approach to Islamic theology and Quranic exegesis.

It was the first of several Islamic movements—including secularism, Islamism, and Salafism—that emerged in the middle of the 19th century in reaction to the rapid changes of the time, especially the perceived onslaught of Western culture and colonialism on the Muslim world. Founders include Muhammad Abduh, a Sheikh of Al-Azhar University for a brief period before his death in 1905, Jamal ad-Din al-Afghani, and Muhammad Rashid Rida (d. 1935).

The early Islamic modernists (al-Afghani and Muhammad Abdu) used the term salafiyya to refer to their attempt at renovation of Islamic thought, and this salafiyya movement is often known in the West as "Islamic modernism," although it is very different from what is currently called the Salafi movement, which generally signifies "ideologies such as wahhabism". According to Malise Ruthven, Islamic modernism suffered since its inception from co-option of its original reformism by both secularist rulers and by "the official ulama" whose "task it is to legitimise" rulers' actions in religious terms.

Examples of liberal movements within Islam are Progressive British Muslims (formed following the 2005 London terrorist attacks, defunct by 2012), British Muslims for Secular Democracy (formed 2006), or Muslims for Progressive Values (formed 2007).

In Eastern religions

Eastern religions were not immediately affected by liberalism and Enlightenment philosophy, and have partly undertaken reform movements only after contact with Western philosophy in the 19th and 20th centuries. Thus Hindu reform movements emerged in British India in the 19th century. Buddhist modernism (or "New Buddhism") arose in its Japanese form as a reaction to the Meiji Restoration, and was again transformed outside of Japan in the 20th century, notably giving rise to modern Zen Buddhism.

Liberal religion in Unitarianism

The term liberal religion has been used by Unitarian Christians, as well as Unitarian Universalists, to refer to their own brand of religious liberalism; the term has also been used by non-Unitarians. The Journal of Liberal Religion was published by the Unitarian Ministerial Union, Meadville Theological School, and Universalist Ministerial Association from 1939 to 1949, and was edited by James Luther Adams, an influential Unitarian theologian. Fifty years later, a new version of the journal was published in an online format from 1999 to 2009.

See also

 Multiple religious belonging
 Post-theism
 Postchristianity
 Red-Letter Christians
 Religious naturalism
 Religious pluralism
 Religious Society of Friends
 Sea of Faith
 Secular theology
 Secularism

Notes

References
 

Religious belief and doctrine
Liberalism and religion